This is a list of colleges and institutes affiliated with Technical Universities of Punjab.

I. K. Gujral Punjab Technical University
I. K. Gujral Punjab Technical University (IKGPTU) was established in 1997 under the Punjab Technical University Act, 1996. During the academic session 2011–12, the university affiliated 100+ engineering Colleges, 139 Management and Computer Application courses, 37 institutions imparting Pharmacy education, 11 colleges imparting Hotel Management education, six colleges providing Architecture Education and 21 Regional Center for M.Tech and Ph D in different branches of Engineering and Management and one Regional Center for M Pharmacy. More than 2013 PTU Learning Centers offer professional education via distance learning to students across the nation and abroad.

Engineering colleges
IKGPTU has 62 affiliated engineering colleges:
Baba Banda Singh Bahadur Engineering college Fatehgarh sahib
 Arybhatt collage of engineering & Technology, Barnala
 Aman Bhalla Institute of Engineering and Technology
 Amritsar College of Engineering and Technology
 Anand College of Engineering & Management
 Baba Kuma Singh Ji Engineering College
 Beant College of Engineering and Technology
 Bhutta College of Engineering & Technology
 Centre for Development of Advanced Computing, Mohali
 CGC College of Engineering
 CGC Technical Campus
 Chandigarh Engineering College
 College of Engineering & Management, Kapurthala
 CT Institute of Engineering Management & Technology
 CT Institute of Technology & Research
 CT Institute of Technology Shahpur, Jalandhar
 DAV Institute of Engineering & Technology
 Doaba Institute of Engg. & Tech.
 Doaba Khalsa Trust Group of Institutions
 G.G.S College of Modern Technology
 Global College of Engineering & Technology, Kahanpur Khui
 Global Group of Institutes, Amritsar
 Golden College of Engg & Technology, Gurdaspur
 Gulzar College of Engineering, Ludhiana
 Gulzar Educational & Charitable Trust's Group of Institutes
 Guru Nanak Dev Engineering College, Ludhiana
 Guru Nanak Institute of Engineering and Management
 IITT College of Engg., Pojewal
 Indo Global College of Engineering
 Institute of Engineering and Technology Bhaddal Technical Campus, Ropar
 KC College of Engineering and Information Technology
 Khalsa College of Engineering & Technology
 Ludhiana College of Engg. & Tech.
 Ludhiana Group of Colleges
 Lyallpur Khalsa College of Engineering
 M.K Education Societies's Group of Institutions
 Modern Group of Colleges
 PTU Nalanda School of Tqm & Entrepreneurship
 Punjab College of Engg. & Tech. Lalru Mandi (Vill. Malakpur) Dist. Patiala Punjab
 Punjab Institute of Engg. & Applied Research
 Quest Infosys Foundation Group of Institutions
 Ram Devi Jindal Educational Charitable Society Group of Institutions
 Ramgarhia Institute of Engineering and Technology
 Rayat Bahra Institute of Engg & Nano Technology
 Rayat Institute of Engineering & Information Technology
 Redical Technical Institute
 S. Sukhjinder Singh Engg. & Tech. College
 Sachdeva Engineering College for Girls
 Sai Institute of Engg & Tech
 Satyam Institute of Engg & Tech, Amritsar
 Shaheed Udham Singh College of Engineering & Technology, Tangori
 Shivshankar Institute of Engg. & Tech
 Sri Sai College of Engineering & Technology Badhani-pathankot
 Sri Sukhmani Institute of Engineering & Technology
 St. Soldier Group of Institutions
 Sukhjindra Technical Campus, Dunera, Gurdaspur
 SUS Engineering College
 Swami Parmanand College of Engineering & Technology
 Swami Parmanand Engineering College
 Swami Sarvanand Institute of Engineering and Technology, Dinanagar
 Tawi Engineering College
 Tawi Engineering College, Shahpur Kandi

Pharmacy colleges
 ISF College Of Pharmacy
 Baba Farid College Of Pharmacy, Mullanpur, Distt. Ludhiana
 Desh Bhagat School of Pharmacy, Desh Bhagat University Mandi Gobindgarh, Dera Bassi
 Anovus Institute of Clinical Research, Chandigarh
 Bahra Institute Of Pharmacy
 Barkat Ullah College Of Pharmacy
 Chandigarh College Of Pharmacy
 Chitkara College Of Pharmacy, Rajpura
 CT Institute Of Pharmaceutical Sciences
 GHG Khalsa College Of Pharmacy
 Doaba College Of Pharmacy
 Global Group of Institutes, Amritsar
 Global College Of Pharmacy
 Government. Institute Of Pharmaceutical Science & Engineering
 Government Polytechnic College For Girls
 Gursewa Institute Of Science & Technology
 Guru Nanak Institute Of Pharmacy
 Khalsa College
 Lala Lajpat Rai College Of Pharmacy
 Malwa College Of Pharmacy ghtiya vala

 PCTE - Institute Of Pharmacy
 Rayat & Bahra College Of Pharmacy
 Rayat & Bahra Institute Of Pharmacy
 Sukhjinder Group Of Institutes, Gurdaspur Campus
 Sukhjinder Group Of Institutes, Dunera Campus
 SD College Of Pharmacy
 Sachdeva College Of Pharmacy
 Shaheed Bhagat Singh Polytechnic & Pharmacy College
 Shaheed Udham Singh College Of Pharmacy
 Shivalik College Of Pharmacy, Nangal
 Sri Sai College Of Pharmacy, Badhani, Pathankot
 St Soldier Institute Of Pharmacy (Lidhran Campus Behind R.E.C (NIT)), Jalandhar 
 Surya College Of Pharmacy
 Swami Vivekanand College Of Pharmacy
 Swift School Of Pharmacy
 VMS College Of Pharmacy

BSc MLT colleges
 Dips Institute of Management and Technology, Jalandhar
 Lovely Institute of Technology, Phagwara
 Guru Sewa Institute of Sciences & Engineering, Garshankar, Hoshiarpur
 Rayat Bahara Institute of Technology, Hoshiarpur
 St. Soldier Management And Technical Institute, Jalandhar

Management institutes, hotel management and catering institutes
 A & M Institute Of Management & Technology, Mamoon, Pathankot
 A & M Institute Of Computer & Technology, Mannoon, Pathankot
 AS Group Of Institutions
 Abbnoor Institute Of Information Technology
 AIMS Ch. Education Society Group Of Colleges, Gharuan, Mohali
 Akal Institute Of Management, Rureke Kalan, Barnala
 Apeejay Institute of Management Technical Campus, Jalandhar
 Aruna's Design College
 Baba Mangal Singh Institute Of Computer Sciences (BMSICS)
 Bahra Faculty Of Management
 Bharat Institute Of Management Studies
 CT Institute Of Hotel Management & Catering Technology
 Career Institute Of Management & Technology
 Centre For Management Studies
 Centre For Management Training & Research, Mohali
 CGC College Of Biotechnology, Gharuan
 CGC School Of Animation & Technology, Gharuan
 Chanakya Institute Of Management & IT, Gharuan
 Chandigarh Business School Of Administration, Landran
 Chandigarh Business School, Gharuan, Mohali
 Chandigarh Business School, Landran
 Chandigarh College Of Hospitality
 Chandigarh College Of Technology, Landran
 Chandigarh Engineering College (Department Of Computer Applications), Landran
 Chitkara School Of Hospitality, Technology & Management
 Chitkara School Of Hotel Management & Technology, Jhansla
 CIIS-Institute Of Science & Technology
 CIIST-IST Mohali
 CT Institute of Advance Management Studies, Jalandhar
 CT Institute Of Engineering, Management & Technology
 CT Institute Of Management & IT
 CT Institute Of Management & Technology
 DIMT, Bulandpur, Jalandhar
 DIPS Institute Of Management & Technology, Jalandhar
 Doaba Business Sshool, Ghataur, Kharar
 Doaba Khalsa Trust Group Of Institutions, Chhokran (Rahon), Nawanshahr
 Doraha Institute Of Management & Technology
 Dr IT Business School (Women), Banur
 Dr IT Business School, Banur
 Dr IT IMT, Banur
 Ferozepur Institute Of Management
 Institute Of Management Studies - Bhaddal, Bhaddal Technical Campus, Ropar
 GGSITR Talwandi Saboo
 Gian Jyoti Institute Of Management & Technology, Mohali
 Gian Jyoti School Of Management, Banur, Shambhu Kalan, Patiala 
 Gian Jyoti School Of Management, Banur
 Global Group of Institutes, Amritsar
 GNAIMT, Phagwara
 GNIPC, Hoshiarpur
 Golden College Of Engineering & Technology
 Golden Institute Of Management & Technology (GIMT), Prem Nagar, Gurdaspur
 Guru Gobind Singh College Of Management & IT, V: Handowal Kalan PO: Bassi Kalan D: Hoshiarpur
 Gurukul Business School, Ramnagar, Banur
 Gurukul Institute Of Management & Technology
 Hiras Imperial College Of Hospitality Mohali, Code-328
 Hoshiarpur Institute Of Management & Technology
 Icaii College Of Management & Technology
 Ideal Institute Of Management & Technology, Manuke, Moga
 IITT College Of Business Management, Pojewal
 Innocent Hearts Group Of Institutions, Loharan, Jalandhar
 Institute Of Technology & Future Management Trends
 KC School Of Management & Computer Applications, Nawanshahar
 KCL Institute Of Management & Technology, Jalandhar
 Lord Krishna College Of Management & Technology
 Lovely Institute Of Management, Phagwara
 Ludhiana Group Of Colleges
 MK Education Societies Group Of Institutions, Amritsar 
 Mata Sahib Kaur Khalsa College For Girls, Jagpal Pur
 National College Of Information College
 PCTE-Institute Of Hotel Management & Catering Technology
 PCTEIP, Jhanday
 Punjab Business School
 Punjab College Of Technical Education Campus 2
 Punjab College Of Technical Education
 Punjab Institute Of Management & Technology
 Quest Infosys Foundation Group Of Institutions
 R&B Institute Of Management, Sahauran Campus, Tehsil Kharar, Mohali
 Rakhra Management College
 Ram Iqbal Institute Of Management & Technology, Patti
 Rattan Professional Education College, Sohana, Mohali
 Rayat & Bahara Institute Of Management, Bohan, Hoshiarpur
 Rayat Institute Of Management, Railmajra
 Ruban Institute of Hospital & Health Management
 SM Degree College, Lehragaga
 S Sukhjinder Singh Institute Of Science & Technology, Gurdaspur
 SD Sabha Institute Of Technology 
 SGAD College Of IT & Management, Khadoor Sahib, Tarn Taran
 Sahibzada Ajit Singh Institute Of IT & Research, Mohali
 Satyam Institute Of Management & Technology, Nakodar
 School Of Management Studies, Bhaddal
 SGTB Institute Of Management & IT
 Shaheed Udham Singh Institute Of IT & Research, Tangori
 Shree Atam Vallabh Jain College Institute Of Management & Technical Studies, Hussainpura, Ludhiana
 Shree Ganesh Group Of Institute Of Management & Technology, Rakhra, Patiala
 Shri Bala Ji Literacy & Ch. Society Group Of Institutions, Bhedpura, Patiala
 Shri Balaji Faculty Of Information Technology & Business Management
 Shri Guru Angad Dev College Of IT & Management
 Shri Guru Ram Das Institute Of Management & Technology, VPO Halwara Tehsil Raikot, Ludhiana
 Shri Ragunath Rai Memorial School Of Management., Ramnagar, Patiala
 Shri Sai Iqbal College Of Management & Information Technology, Badhani, Pathankot
 Social Inst. Of Management & Technology, Jalandhar 
 Sri Guru Arjun Dev College Of Management & Technology, Dhariwal
 Sri Sukhmani Institute Of Hospitality & Management
 St. Kabir Institute Of Information & Management Technology
 St. Soldier Management & Technical Institute
 SUSIMT, Tangori
 Swami Sarvanand Gir Institute Of IT, Hoshiarpur
 Swami Sarvanand Institute Of Management & Technology
 Swami Satyanand College Of Management & Technology
 Swami Vivekanand Institute Of Management For Women, Banur
 Swami Vivekanand Institute Of Technology, Banur
 Swift Institute Of Management & Technology, Ghaggar, Patiala
 Synetic Business School, Sahibana, Ludhiana
 Tagore Institute Of Management & Technology, Patran
 Takshila Management & Technology Campus, Hassanpur, Patiala
 Technical Education College
 The Berkley College, Patiala
 Vidya Jyoti Educational Society, VPO Gholu Majra, Tehsil Dera Bassi, SAS Nagar
 VMS Institute Of Management

Architecture colleges
 Giani Zail Singh College Of Engineering & Technology
 Chitkara School Of Planning & Architecture
 College Of Architecture, IET, Bhaddal
 College Of Architecture - Bhaddal, Bhaddal Technical Campus (Ropar)
 Indo Global CollegeOf Architecture

Maharaja Ranjit Singh State Technical University
Maharaja Ranjit Singh State Technical University (MRSSTU) is a State technical university of Punjab located in Bathinda. It was established in 2014 to promote technical, management and pharmaceutical education in the state of Punjab at the degree level and above. And different affiliated colleges and institutes are:

Engineering Colleges

 Amritsar College Of Engineering & Technology
 Asra College Of Engineering & Technology
 Aryans College of Engineering
 BIS College
 swami vivekanand institute of engineering and technology
 Baba Banda Singh Bahadur Engineering College
 Baba Farid College Of Engineering & Technology
 Baba Hira Singh Bhattal Institute Of Engineering & Technology
 Baba Kuma Singh Ji Engineering College
 Bhai Gurdas Institute of Engineering & Technology
 Bhai Maha Singh College Of Engineering
 Bharat Institute Of Engineering & Technology
 Bhutta College Of Engineering & Technology
 Desh Bhagat School of Animation & Multimedia under Desh Bhagat University Mandi Gobindgarh
 Ferozepur College Of Engineering & Technology
 GEA National College (Assam)
 Ghubaya College Of Engineering & Technology
 Giani Zail Sing College Of Engineering & Technology
 Global College Of Engineering & Technology, Kahanpur Khui
 Global Institute Of Management & Emerging Technologies, Amritsar
 Gulzar Institute Of Engineering & Technology
 Guru Nanak Dev Engineering College, Ludhiana
 Guru Nanak Institute Of Engineering & Management
 Guru Ram Dass Institute Of Engineering & Technology
 Jasdev Singh Sandhu Institute Of Engineering & Technology, Patiala
 Kings Group Of Institutions, Barnala 
 Lala Lajpat Rai Group Of Institutes
 Ludhiana College Of Engineering, Ktani Kalan, Lushian
 Ludhiana Group Of Colleges (Chowk Chaukiman)
 Malout Institute Of Management & Information Technology, Malout
 North West Institute Of Engineering & Technology, Dhudike
 Patiala Institute Of Engineering & Technology For Women
 Regional Institute Of Management & Technology
 RIMT Institute Of Engineering & Technology
 RIMT-Maharaja Aggrasen Engineering College
 S Sukhjinder Singh Engineering & Technology College
 Sai Institute Of Engineering & Technology, Manawala, Amritsar
 Shaheed Bhagat Singh State Technical Campus
 Abesh Institute Of Engineering & Technology.
 Abesh Institute Of Engineering & Technology.
 Indian Institute Of Engineering & Technology.

Pharmacy Colleges
 Adesh Institute Of Pharmacy & Biomedical Science (AIMSR)
 Akal College Of Pharmacy & Technical Education
 Desh Bhagat School of Pharmacy under Desh Bhagat University Mandi Gobindgarh
 Government. Institute Of Pharmaceutical Science & Engineering
 Government Polytechnic College For Girls
 Gursewa Institute Of Science & Technology
 Guru Nanak Institute Of Pharmacy
 ISF College Of Pharmacy
 Khalsa College
 Lala Lajpat Rai College Of Pharmacy
 Malwa College Of Pharmacy
 SD College Of Pharmacy
 Sachdeva College Of Pharmacy
 Sai Institute Of Pharmaceutical Education & Research, Manawala, Amritsar
 Shaheed Bhagat Singh Polytechnic & Pharmacy College

BSc MLT Colleges
 Baba Isher Singh Institute of Technology, VPO Gagra Moga
 Desh Bhagat School of Paramedical Sciences under Desh Bhagat University Mandi Gobindgarh
 Malwa Polytechnic College, Faridkot

ISF College of Pharmacy, Moga

Management Institutes / Hotel Management & Catering Institutes
 AS Group Of Institutions
 Abbnoor Institute Of Information Technology
 Adesh Institute Of Bio Medical Science, Bathinda
 Akal Institute Of Management, Rureke Kalan, Barnala
 Arya Bhatta Institute Of Management & Technology, Chemma, Barnala
 Aryabhatta Group Of Institutes, Barnala
 Aryans Business School
 Aryans Institute Of Management, Nepra, Rajpura, Patiala
 Aryans School Of Management, Nepra, Rajpura, Patiala
 Baba Farid College Of Management, Deon, Bathinda
 Baba Farid Institute Of Computer & Institute Of Technology, Barnala
 Baba Isher Singh Institute Of Sciences & Technology
 Baba Khajandas College Of Management Technology, Ludhiana
 Baba Mangal Singh Institute Of Computer Sciences (BMSICS)
 Baba Shri Chand College Of Management, Nurpura,
 Bahra Faculty Of Management
 Bawa Nihal Singh Institute Of Information Technology, Muktsar
 Bhai Gurdas Business School, Rakhra, Patiala
 Bhai Gurdas Institute Of Management & Technology, Sangrur
 Bhai Maha Singh College Of IT & Life Sciences, Muktsar
 Bharat Institute Of Management Studies
 BNSM CTE Alamgir
 Career Institute Of Management & Technology
 College Of Management & Technology, Patiala
 Cordia Institute Of Business Management Technology, Sanghol
 Dashmesh Institute Of Management & Technology
 Desh Bhagat Foundation Groups Of Institutions, Moga
 Desh Bhagat School of Hotel Management & Catering Technology under Desh Bhagat University Mandi Gobindgarh
 Global Institute Of Management
 Global Institute Of Management & Emerging Technologies, Amritsar
 Golden College Of Engineering & Technology
 Golden Institute Of Management & Technology (GIMT), Prem Nagar, Gurdaspur
 Gujranwala Guru Nanak Institute Of Management & Technology
 Gulzar School Of Management, Libra, Khanna
 Gurdasidevi Institute Of Management & Technology, Budhlada, Mansa
 Guru Arjan Dev College Of Management & Technology, Barnala 
 Guru Gobind Singh College Of Management & Technology, Gidderbaha, Mukatsar
 Guru Gobind Singh IT & Research
 Guru Harkrishan Girls College,  Phallewal Khurd, Tehsil Malerkotla, Sangrur
 Guru Nanak College Of Management & Technology, Mandi Killianwali (Doomwali), Bathinda
 Guru Nanak Institute Of Management & Technology 
 Guru Teg Bahadur Institute Of Management & Technology, Dakha, Ludhiana
 Gurukul Business School, Ramnagar, Banur
 Gurukul Institute Of Management & Technology
 Hoshiarpur Institute Of Management & Technology
 Icaii College Of Management & Technology
 Ideal Institute Of Management & Technology, Manuke, Moga
 Institute Of Management. Studies, Ludhiana.
 JD Institute Of Management, Muktsar
 Jyoti College Of Computer Science & Technology
 Kay Jay School Of Management & Technology, Patiala
 Khalsa College Of Technology & Business Studies, Amritsar
 Khalsa Institute Of Management Technology For Women, Ludhiana
 Lala Jagat Naryan Institute Of Information Technology & Management, Jalalabad
 Lala Lajpat Rai Memorial Institute Of Management & Technology
 Laxmi Bai Institute Of Management & Technology, Patiala
 Lord Krishna College Of Management & Technology
 Ludhiana Group Of Colleges
 MK Education Societies Group Of Institutions, Amritsar 
 ML Memorial Technical College, Killi Chahdan, Moga
 MLB Institute Of Management &Technology, Jagraon
 Maharaja Ranjit Singh Khalsa Technical College, Bathinda
 Mahavir Educational & Charitable Trust Group Of Institutes
 Malout Institute Of Management & Information Technology, Malout
 Malwa College, Ludhiana
 Malwa Institute Of Management, Dhablan, Patiala
 Mata Sahib Kaur Khalsa College For Girls, Jagpal Pur
 National College Of Information College
 PCTE-Institute Of Hotel Management & Catering Technology
 PCTEIP, Jhanday
 Pine Grove College Of Management & Technology, Bassi Pathanan, Fatehgarh Sahib
 Punjab Business School
 Punjab College Of Technical Education Campus 2
 Punjab College Of Technical Education
 Punjab Institute Of Management & Technology
 Quest Infosys Foundation Group Of Institutions
 R&B Institute Of Management, Sahauran Campus, Tehsil Kharar, Mohali
 Rakhra Management College
 Ram Iqbal Institute Of Management & Technology, Patti
 Regional Inst. Of IT & Management, Behman Dhiwana, Bathinda
 Regional Institute Of Management
 Regional Institute Of Management & Technology, Mandi Gobindgarh
 RIMT, School Of Management Studies, Mandi Gobindgarh
 RIMT-Institute Of Management & Computer Technology, Mandi Gobindgarh
 Ruban Institute of Hospital & Health Management
 SM Degree College, Lehragaga
 SD Sabha Institute Of Technology 
 SGAD College Of IT & Management, Khadoor Sahib, Tarn Taran
 SSD Institute of Management, Bathinda
 Sai Institute Of Management, Manawala, Amritsar
 Satyam Institute Of Management & Technology, Nakodar
 Satyam Institute Of Management, Amritsar
 School Of Management Studies, Bhaddal
 SGTB Institute Of Management & IT
 Shaheed Udham Singh Institute Of IT & Research, Tangori
 Shree Atam Vallabh Jain College Institute Of Management & Technical Studies, Hussainpura, Ludhiana
 Shree Ganesh Institute Of Management & Technology, Rakhra, Patiala
 Shri Bala Ji Literacy & Ch. Society Group Of Institutions, Bhedpura, Patiala
 Shri Balaji Faculty Of Information Technology & Business Management
 Shri Guru Angad Dev College Of IT & Management
 Shri Guru Ram Das Institute Of Management & Technology, VPO Halwara Tehsil Raikot, Ludhiana
 Shri Ragunath Rai Memorial School Of Management., Ramnagar, Patiala
 Sidana Institute Of Management & Technology, Khiala Khurd, Amritsar
 Sri Sukhmani Institute Of Hospitality & Management
 St. Kabir Institute Of Information & Management Technology
 Swami Vivekanand Business School, Ram Nagar, Patiala
 Swami Vivekanand Institute Of Management & Technology, Ram Nagar, Patiala
 Swift Institute Of Management & Technology, Ghaggar, Patiala
 Synetic Business School, Sahibana, Ludhiana
 Takshila Management & Technology Campus, Hassanpur, Patiala
 The Berkley College, Patiala
 VMS Institute Of Management
 Westwood Institute of Hotel Management, Zirakpur, Mohali

Architecture Colleges
 Department of Architecture, Desh Bhagat School of Engineering under Desh Bhagat University Mandi Gobindgarh
 Giani Zail Singh College Of Engineering & Technology
 RIMT-College Of Architecture
 Sai School Of Architecture, Mannawala, Amritsar

References

External links
 List of all regional centres of PTU-Mrcollegehub.com
 Official website of PTU
 Official website of APJIMTC JALANDHAR

Education in Jalandhar
Punjab, India-related lists
Punjab
I. K. Gujral Punjab Technical University
Maharaja Ranjit Singh Punjab Technical University
Education in Bathinda